Fushimi is a Japanese surname. Notable people with the surname include:

, Japanese snowboarder
, Japanese prince
, Imperial Japanese Navy officer
, Japanese cyclist
, Japanese writer
, Japanese volleyball player
, Japanese women's footballer

Japanese-language surnames